The Man Who Came to Dinner is a 1942 American screwball comedy film directed by William Keighley, and starring Bette Davis, Ann Sheridan and, as the titular character,  Monty Woolley. The screenplay by Julius and Philip G. Epstein is based on the 1939 play The Man Who Came to Dinner by Moss Hart and George S. Kaufman.  The supporting cast features Jimmy Durante and Billie Burke.

Plot
While passing through small-town Ohio during a cross-country lecture tour, notoriously acerbic New York radio personality Sheridan Whiteside breaks his hip after slipping and falling on the icy steps of the house of the Stanleys, a prominent Ohio family with whom he's supposed to dine as a publicity stunt. He insists on recuperating in their home during the Christmas holidays.

The overbearing, self-centered celebrity soon comes to dominate the lives of the residents and everyone else who enters the household. He encourages young adults Richard and June Stanley to pursue their dreams, much to the dismay of their conventional father, Ernest.

Meanwhile, Whiteside's assistant Maggie Cutler finds herself attracted to local newspaperman Bert Jefferson. When Bert reads his play to her, she is so impressed she asks Whiteside to show it to his contacts and then announces she will quit his employment and marry Bert. 

Her boss is loath to lose such an efficient aide and does his best to sabotage the blossoming romance. He also exaggerates the effects of his injuries to be able to stay in the house to further his sabotage. He suggests actress Lorraine Sheldon would be perfect for one of the leading roles, intending to have her steal Bert away from Maggie. Lorraine convinces Bert to spend time with her to fix up the play. 

When Maggie realizes Whiteside is behind the underhanded scheme, she quits. Somewhat chastened, Whiteside concocts a plan to get Lorraine out of the way, with the help of his friend Banjo. They trap Lorraine in an Egyptian sarcophagus, and Banjo ships her off to Nova Scotia. 
 
Finally fed up with his shenanigans, meddling, insults, and unbearable personality, Mr. Stanley swears out a warrant ordering Whiteside to leave in 15 minutes. However, with seconds to spare, Whiteside blackmails Mr. Stanley into dropping the warrant, and allowing his children to do as they please by threatening to reveal Stanley's sister Harriet's past as an infamous axe murderess. 

As Whiteside departs — he falls on the Stanleys' icy steps again and is carried back inside, much to Stanley's consternation.

Cast

 Bette Davis as Maggie Cutler
 Ann Sheridan as Lorraine Sheldon
 Monty Woolley as Sheridan Whiteside
 Richard Travis as Bert Jefferson
 Jimmy Durante as Banjo
 Billie Burke as Mrs. Ernest Stanley (Daisy)
 Reginald Gardiner as Beverly Carlton
 Elisabeth Fraser as June Stanley
 Grant Mitchell as Ernest Stanley
 George Barbier as Dr. Bradley
 Mary Wickes as Miss Preen
 Russell Arms as Richard Stanley
 Ruth Vivian as Harriet Stanley
 Edwin Stanley as John
 Betty Roadman as Sarah
 Charles Drake as Sandy
 Nanette Vallon as Cosette
 John Ridgely as Radio man

Uncredited
(in order of appearance)

 Dudley DickersonPorter at train station
 Patrick McVeyHarry, the baggage clerk
 Roland DrewReporter
 Ernie AdamsMichaelson
 Leslie BrooksHollywood blonde
 Georgia CarrollHollywood blonde
 Bess FlowersFan at train station
 Florence WixFan at train station
 Leah BairdFan at train station
 Lottie WilliamsFan at train station
 Sol GorssChauffeur
 Beal WongChinese guest
 Kam TongChinese guest
 Creighton HaleRadio man
 Hank MannExpressman
 Eddy ChandlerGuard
 Fred KelseyDetective
 Frank MayoPlainclothesman
 Jack MowerPlainclothesman
 Alix TaltonChorus girl
 Frank MoranHaggerty

Cast notes
 Monty Woolley, Ruth Vivian, and Mary Wickes reprised their roles from the original Broadway production.
 Russell Arms made his screen debut.

Production

Four of the leading characters are based on real-life personalities. Sheridan Whiteside was inspired by celebrated critic and Algonquin Round Table member Alexander Woollcott, who eventually played the role on stage; Lorraine Sheldon by musical stage actress Gertrude Lawrence; Beverly Carlton by playwright and renowned wit Noël Coward; and Banjo by Algonguin Round Table member Harpo Marx.

When Bette Davis saw the Broadway production of The Man Who Came to Dinner, she decided the role of Maggie Cutler would be a refreshing change of pace following her heavily dramatic role in The Little Foxes. She urged Jack L. Warner to purchase the screen rights for her and John Barrymore. He tested for the role of Whiteside but was deemed unsuitable when, as a result of his heavy drinking (or perhaps encroaching Alzheimers), he supposedly had difficulty delivering the complicated, fast-paced dialogue, even with his lines posted on cue cards throughout the set. The screen test was exhibited at the Museum of Modern Art in the early 21st century prior to a screening of the film, making the reason for Davis' subsequent rage at the studio's decision not to cast the superb Barrymore quite apparent.

Both Charles Laughton and Orson Welles, who wanted to direct the film, campaigned for the role, and Laird Cregar and Robert Benchley made screen tests; but executive producer Hal B. Wallis thought the former was "overblown and extravagant" and the latter "too mild mannered." Warner suggested Cary Grant, but Wallis felt he was "far too young and attractive." Although Monty Woolley, who had created the role on the Broadway stage, was not familiar to movie audiences, Wallis finally cast him in the role, despite Warner's concern that the actor's homosexuality would be obvious on screen. Orson Welles would later play Whiteside 30 years later in a television adaptation of the play.

Bette Davis detested the casting of Woolley; she fought hard to cast John Barrymore but was overruled by the studio. In later years, she observed, "I felt the film was not directed in a very imaginative way. For me, it was not a happy film to make; that it was a success, of course, did make me happy. I guess I never got over my disappointment in not working with the great John Barrymore."

Critical reception
On the review aggregator website Rotten Tomatoes, 86% of 7 critics' reviews are positive, with an average rating of 7.8/10.

Bosley Crowther of The New York Times observed, "Any one who happened to miss the original acid-throwing antic on the stage – and any one, for that matter, who happened not to have missed it – should pop around, by all means, and catch the cinematic reprise. For here, in the space of something like an hour and fifty-two minutes, is compacted what is unquestionably the most vicious but hilarious cat-clawing exhibition ever put on the screen, a deliciously wicked character portrait and a helter-skelter satire, withal." He added, "Woolley makes The Man Who Came to Dinner a rare old goat. His zest for rascality is delightful, he spouts alliterations as though he were spitting out orange seeds, and his dynamic dudgeons in a wheelchair are even mightier than those of Lionel Barrymore. A more entertaining buttinsky could hardly be conceived, and a less entertaining one would be murdered on the spot. One palm should be handed Bette Davis for accepting the secondary role of the secretary, and another palm should be handed her for playing it so moderately and well." In conclusion, he said, "The picture as a whole is a bit too long and internally complex for 100 per cent comprehension, considering the speed at which it clips. But even if you don't catch all of it, you're sure to get your money's worth. It makes laughing at famous people a most satisfying delight."

Variety made note of the "superb casting and nifty work by every member of the company" and thought the "only detracting angle in the entire film is [the] slowness of the first quarter. [The] portion in which the characters are being built up, before the complications of the story actually begin, is overlong."

Time stated, "Woolley plays Sheridan Whiteside with such vast authority and competence that it is difficult to imagine anyone else attempting it" and added, "Although there is hardly room for the rest of the cast to sandwich in much of a performance between this fattest of fat parts, Bette Davis, hair up, neuroses gone, is excellent as Woolley's lovesick secretary."

Time Out London said, "It's rather unimaginatively directed, but the performers savour the sharp, sparklingly cynical dialogue with glee."

Monty Woolley was nominated for a New York Film Critics Circle Award in 1942 for Best Actor.

Box Office
According to Warner Bros records, the film earned rentals of $1,666,000 in the United States and Canada and $899,000 foreign for a worldwide total of $2,565,000.

Home media
Warner Home Video released the Region 1 DVD on May 30, 2006. The film has an English audio track and subtitles in English, Spanish, and French. Bonus features include The Man Who Came to Dinner: Inside a Classic Comedy, the Joe McDoakes comedy short So You Think You Need Glasses, the musical short Six Hits and a Miss (directed by Jean Negulesco), and the original theatrical trailer.

See also
 List of Christmas films

References

Further reading
Wallis, Hal B. and Higham, Charles, Starmaker: The Autobiography of Hal Wallis. New York: Macmillan Publishing Company 1980.

External links

 
 
 
 

1942 films
1940s Christmas comedy films
1940s screwball comedy films
American black-and-white films
American Christmas comedy films
American films based on plays
American screwball comedy films
1940s English-language films
Films about actors
Films about radio people
Films about writers
Films directed by William Keighley
Films scored by Friedrich Hollaender
Films set in Ohio
Films with screenplays by Julius J. Epstein
Films with screenplays by Philip G. Epstein
Warner Bros. films
1942 comedy films
1940s American films